Administrative and Recruitment Affairs Organization of Iran (ARAO) or Department of State for Administration and Employment Affairs was revived on 2 August 2016 on an order by Iran's President Hassan Rouhani.

The organization is currently headed by Meysam Latifi.

References

Government agencies of Iran